The 1001 class were a class of ten diesel-electric locomotive built by English Electric and Vulcan Foundry in 1955 for Nigerian Railways along with fourteen for the Gold Coast Railways (later Ghana Railways) as their 1000 class. Construction and layout was a very similar to the earlier NZR De class.

Description
The 1001 class were hood type locomotives with end cab and access platforms at each end. They were powered by an English Electric 6SRKT Mark II engine rated at 750 bhp. The main generator was directly mounted to the engine making one rigid unit, the complete unit being mounted to the underframe on three resilient mounts. The engine was governed at one of three set speeds as required by the duty being performed. The speeds, when the engine was on load, were 450, 620 and 850 rpm.

The main generator was a single bearing machine and supplies current to the traction motors and the radiator fan motor. The output of the generator was dependent on its field strength and on the speed of the diesel engine, both of which were controlled by the driver through the controller. On the last control notch the field strength of the generator was automatically adjusted to ensure that the generator output matched the maximum available power of the diesel engine irrespective of locomotive speed.

The auxiliary generator, which provided power for the control gear circuits, battery charging, lighting and all auxiliary machines, was mounted on the end of the main generator frame and its armature was carried on an extension of the main generator shaft. The four traction motors were of the axle hung, nose suspended type driving to the axles through single reduction spur gears. They were connected electrically with two in permanent series, so as to form two groups in parallel.

An all-welded underframe had a single driving cab at one end, and a long hood housing the engine-generator group and the auxiliary control equipment. The main underframe members and cross plates were welded to form the main fuel tank, of 400 gallons capacity. Along the inside bottom was a steel plate welded in to form an oil tight seal and prevent any fuel or any oil spillage reaching the traction motors. The cab was entered from the end platform through a centre door, but had an additional emergency door in the hood side. There was a double roof to give some insulation from the sun’s heat. Nigerian locomotives had cow catchers and ABC couplers, Ghanaian locomotives had Visco No 2 Alliance couplers.

The hood comprised a compartment housing the water and oil cooling radiators and the fan; a motor blower group for the traction motors along with its own air filters; and a motor driven air compressor with suction strainer, and an air reservoir. Air for the electro-pneumatic control gear, sanding, window wipers and emergency refuelling of the locomotives, was supplied from this system. The second compartment in the main casing contained the main engine and generator with the main air intake-air filters and the lubricating oil filters. The third compartment, back against the driving cab, houses the auxiliary generator, control gear cubicles, resistances and air filters. Access to all three compartments was by hinged doors on both sides, but the roof over the central compartment was removable and also contained sliding hatches above the cylinder heads and turbo-blowers. A 72-cell alkaline battery provided current for engine starting and other purposes, and was housed in a box outside the main casing on the left-hand side: similarly situated on the right-hand side were two motor-driven exhausters for the locomotive and train brakes, both of which were on the automatic vacuum system. Locomotive brakes were applied from two 24" "Prestall" vacuum cylinders, one on the inner headstocks of each bogie. Clasp type brakes were provided on all wheels. The brake blocks were all cast iron of the renewable slipper type carried in cast steel holders and secured by cotters. The eyes of the brake rigging were fitted with hardened steel bushes and the pins, secured by split cotters, were case hardened.

Brake equipment, an E10 compressor, and compressed air fittings for controls, fuelling and sanding, were supplied by the Westinghouse Brake & Signal Co. Ltd. Pneumatic sanding was provided for each direction of travel. The sand boxes were fabricated integrally with the underframe.
One piece steel castings were used for the bogie frames with all brackets cast integrally, and the swing bolster also was a steel casting, supported by external swing links. Thrust and side bearing faces were fitted with manganese steel liners. Centre pivots were separate castings spigoted to the bolsters and were fitted with phosphor bronze linings arranged for grease lubrication. The wheel centres were of the rolled steel disc type, the roller bearing axleboxes being of Hoffman manufacture. Laminated springs were arranged above the axleboxes and worked in conjunction with auxiliary coil springs which acted between the frame and the spring links. The bolster springs were arranged in two compound groups with an elliptic laminated spring, working in conjunction with two nests of coil springs in each group. Rubberised fabric washers were interposed between all coil springs and their supports.

The controller contains three handles, mechanically interlocked to prevent incorrect operation. These, controlling groups of cam operated contacts, were the master switch key, the reverser handle and the control handle. The master switch key was a selector switch having three positions, "Off", "On" and "EO" (engine only). The reverser handle controlled the setting of the pneumatic reversing switch and the control handle operated the various relays, contactors and engine speed solenoids to vary the locomotive power output.

In order to stretch the locomotive performance characteristic, field weakening of the traction motors was provided for. This was an automatic feature after maximum excitation of the main generator had been reached and when the engine was running at maximum speed with the control handle in the last notch.

Wheel slip relays which indicate slipping by any pair of wheels were fitted.

History

References

 
 

Bo-Bo locomotives
English Electric locomotives
Diesel-electric locomotives of Nigeria
Railway locomotives introduced in 1955
3 ft 6 in gauge locomotives of Nigeria
Vulcan Foundry locomotives